Cephalohibiscus is a genus of flowering plants belonging to the family Malvaceae.

Its native range is New Guinea to Solomon Islands.

Species:
 Cephalohibiscus peekelii Ulbr.

References

Malvaceae
Malvaceae genera